The 2002–03 Toronto Maple Leafs season was the team's 86th season of the franchise, and the 76th season as the Maple Leafs.

Off-season
Key dates prior to the start of the season:
 The 2002 NHL Entry Draft
 The free agency period began on July 1.

Regular season
The Maple Leafs were the most penalized team during the regular season, being penalized 426 times.

Season standings

Playoffs
The Maple Leafs qualified for the Stanley Cup playoffs for the fifth consecutive year. They lost to the Philadelphia Flyers in 7 games in the first round.

Schedule and results

Regular season

|- align="center" bgcolor="#CCFFCC"
|1||W||October 10, 2002||6–0 || align="left"| @ Pittsburgh Penguins (2002–03) ||1–0–0–0 || 
|- align="center" bgcolor="#FFBBBB"
|2||L||October 12, 2002||1–2 || align="left"| Ottawa Senators (2002–03) ||1–1–0–0 || 
|- align="center" bgcolor="#FFBBBB"
|3||L||October 14, 2002||4–5 || align="left"| Pittsburgh Penguins (2002–03) ||1–2–0–0 || 
|- align="center" bgcolor="#FFBBBB"
|4||L||October 15, 2002||4–5 || align="left"| @ New York Rangers (2002–03) ||1–3–0–0 || 
|- align="center" bgcolor="#CCFFCC"
|5||W||October 17, 2002||5–3 || align="left"|  Phoenix Coyotes (2002–03) ||2–3–0–0 || 
|- align="center"
|6||T||October 19, 2002||2–2 OT|| align="left"| @ Montreal Canadiens (2002–03) ||2–3–1–0 || 
|- align="center" bgcolor="#FFBBBB"
|7||L||October 21, 2002||1–4 || align="left"|  Boston Bruins (2002–03) ||2–4–1–0 || 
|- align="center" bgcolor="#FFBBBB"
|8||L||October 23, 2002||1–4 || align="left"|  Florida Panthers (2002–03) ||2–5–1–0 || 
|- align="center" bgcolor="#FFBBBB"
|9||L||October 26, 2002||3–4 || align="left"|  New York Rangers (2002–03) ||2–6–1–0 || 
|- align="center" bgcolor="#CCFFCC"
|10||W||October 28, 2002||5–2 || align="left"|  Mighty Ducks of Anaheim (2002–03) ||3–6–1–0 || 
|- align="center"
|11||T||October 31, 2002||3–3 OT|| align="left"|  Atlanta Thrashers (2002–03) ||3–6–2–0 || 
|-

|- align="center" bgcolor="#FFBBBB"
|12||L||November 2, 2002 †||2–5 || align="left"|  Montreal Canadiens (2002–03) ||3–7–2–0 || 
|- align="center" bgcolor="#CCFFCC"
|13||W||November 5, 2002||4–3 || align="left"|  Tampa Bay Lightning (2002–03) ||4–7–2–0 || 
|- align="center" bgcolor="#FFBBBB"
|14||L||November 8, 2002||1–2 || align="left"| @ Dallas Stars (2002–03) ||4–8–2–0 || 
|- align="center" bgcolor="#FFBBBB"
|15||L||November 9, 2002||3–6 || align="left"| @ St. Louis Blues (2002–03) ||4–9–2–0 || 
|- align="center" bgcolor="#CCFFCC"
|16||W||November 12, 2002||4–3 OT|| align="left"|  Los Angeles Kings (2002–03) ||5–9–2–0 || 
|- align="center" bgcolor="#CCFFCC"
|17||W||November 15, 2002||3–2 || align="left"| @ Buffalo Sabres (2002–03) ||6–9–2–0 || 
|- align="center" bgcolor="#FFBBBB"
|18||L||November 16, 2002||1–2 || align="left"|  Detroit Red Wings (2002–03) ||6–10–2–0 || 
|- align="center" bgcolor="#CCFFCC"
|19||W||November 19, 2002||2–0 || align="left"|  Boston Bruins (2002–03) ||7–10–2–0 || 
|- align="center" bgcolor="#CCFFCC"
|20||W||November 23, 2002||6–0 || align="left"|  Philadelphia Flyers (2002–03) ||8–10–2–0 || 
|- align="center" bgcolor="#FFBBBB"
|21||L||November 25, 2002||0–2 || align="left"| @ Ottawa Senators (2002–03) ||8–11–2–0 || 
|- align="center" bgcolor="#CCFFCC"
|22||W||November 26, 2002||5–4 || align="left"|  Washington Capitals (2002–03) ||9–11–2–0 || 
|- align="center" bgcolor="#CCFFCC"
|23||W||November 29, 2002||3–0 || align="left"| @ Philadelphia Flyers (2002–03) ||10–11–2–0 || 
|- align="center" bgcolor="#CCFFCC"
|24||W||November 30, 2002||3–1 || align="left"|  Buffalo Sabres (2002–03) ||11–11–2–0 || 
|-

|- align="center" bgcolor="#CCFFCC"
|25||W||December 3, 2002||4–3 OT|| align="left"|  Tampa Bay Lightning (2002–03) ||12–11–2–0 || 
|- align="center" bgcolor="#FFBBBB"
|26||L||December 6, 2002||2–4 || align="left"| @ New York Islanders (2002–03) ||12–12–2–0 || 
|- align="center" bgcolor="#CCFFCC"
|27||W||December 7, 2002||1–0 || align="left"|  New Jersey Devils (2002–03) ||13–12–2–0 || 
|- align="center" bgcolor="#CCFFCC"
|28||W||December 10, 2002||4–2 || align="left"|  Pittsburgh Penguins (2002–03) ||14–12–2–0 || 
|- align="center" bgcolor="#FFBBBB"
|29||L||December 12, 2002||1–2 || align="left"| @ Philadelphia Flyers (2002–03) ||14–13–2–0 || 
|- align="center" bgcolor="#CCFFCC"
|30||W||December 14, 2002||4–1 || align="left"|  New York Rangers (2002–03) ||15–13–2–0 || 
|- align="center" bgcolor="#FFBBBB"
|31||L||December 16, 2002||0–1 || align="left"| @ Atlanta Thrashers (2002–03) ||15–14–2–0 || 
|- align="center"
|32||T||December 18, 2002||2–2 OT|| align="left"| @ Florida Panthers (2002–03) ||15–14–3–0 || 
|- align="center" bgcolor="#CCFFCC"
|33||W||December 19, 2002||2–1 || align="left"| @ Tampa Bay Lightning (2002–03) ||16–14–3–0 || 
|- align="center"
|34||T||December 21, 2002||3–3 OT|| align="left"|  San Jose Sharks (2002–03) ||16–14–4–0 || 
|- align="center" bgcolor="#CCFFCC"
|35||W||December 23, 2002||5–1 || align="left"|  Atlanta Thrashers (2002–03) ||17–14–4–0 || 
|- align="center" bgcolor="#CCFFCC"
|36||W||December 27, 2002||4–3 || align="left"| @ Calgary Flames (2002–03) ||18–14–4–0 || 
|- align="center" bgcolor="#ffc"
|37||OTL||December 28, 2002||2–3 OT|| align="left"| @ Edmonton Oilers (2002–03) ||18–14–4–1 || 
|- align="center" bgcolor="#CCFFCC"
|38||W||December 31, 2002||5–3 || align="left"| @ Vancouver Canucks (2002–03) ||19–14–4–1 || 
|-

|- align="center" bgcolor="#FFBBBB"
|39||L||January 3, 2003||0–2 || align="left"| @ New Jersey Devils (2002–03) ||19–15–4–1 || 
|- align="center" bgcolor="#CCFFCC"
|40||W||January 4, 2003||2–1 || align="left"|  New Jersey Devils (2002–03) ||20–15–4–1 || 
|- align="center" bgcolor="#CCFFCC"
|41||W||January 7, 2003||5–2 || align="left"|  Boston Bruins (2002–03) ||21–15–4–1 || 
|- align="center" bgcolor="#CCFFCC"
|42||W||January 9, 2003||4–2 || align="left"| @ Pittsburgh Penguins (2002–03) ||22–15–4–1 || 
|- align="center" bgcolor="#FFBBBB"
|43||L||January 11, 2003||2–6 || align="left"| @ Boston Bruins (2002–03) ||22–16–4–1 || 
|- align="center" bgcolor="#FFBBBB"
|44||L||January 13, 2003||1–5 || align="left"| @ New York Rangers (2002–03) ||22–17–4–1 || 
|- align="center" bgcolor="#CCFFCC"
|45||W||January 14, 2003||3–2 || align="left"|  Calgary Flames (2002–03) ||23–17–4–1 || 
|- align="center" bgcolor="#CCFFCC"
|46||W||January 17, 2003||4–1 || align="left"| @ Washington Capitals (2002–03) ||24–17–4–1 || 
|- align="center" bgcolor="#CCFFCC"
|47||W||January 18, 2003||3–2 OT|| align="left"| @ Montreal Canadiens (2002–03) ||25–17–4–1 || 
|- align="center" bgcolor="#FFBBBB"
|48||L||January 21, 2003||1–3 || align="left"|  Philadelphia Flyers (2002–03) ||25–18–4–1 || 
|- align="center" bgcolor="#FFBBBB"
|49||L||January 24, 2003||0–4 || align="left"| @ Buffalo Sabres (2002–03) ||25–19–4–1 || 
|- align="center" bgcolor="#FFBBBB"
|50||L||January 25, 2003||0–3 || align="left"|  Colorado Avalanche (2002–03) ||25–20–4–1 || 
|- align="center" bgcolor="#CCFFCC"
|51||W||January 29, 2003||3–2 || align="left"| @ Carolina Hurricanes (2002–03) ||26–20–4–1 || 
|- align="center" bgcolor="#CCFFCC"
|52||W||January 30, 2003||5–2 || align="left"| @ Atlanta Thrashers (2002–03) ||27–20–4–1 || 
|-

|- align="center" bgcolor="#CCFFCC"
|53||W||February 5, 2003||6–0 || align="left"| @ Florida Panthers (2002–03) ||28–20–4–1 || 
|- align="center" bgcolor="#CCFFCC"
|54||W||February 6, 2003||3–2 OT|| align="left"| @ Tampa Bay Lightning (2002–03) ||29–20–4–1 || 
|- align="center" bgcolor="#CCFFCC"
|55||W||February 8, 2003||3–1 || align="left"|  Montreal Canadiens (2002–03) ||30–20–4–1 || 
|- align="center" bgcolor="#FFBBBB"
|56||L||February 11, 2003||4–5 || align="left"|  Edmonton Oilers (2002–03) ||30–21–4–1 || 
|- align="center" bgcolor="#CCFFCC"
|57||W||February 12, 2003||3–1 || align="left"| @ Chicago Blackhawks (2002–03) ||31–21–4–1 || 
|- align="center" bgcolor="#CCFFCC"
|58||W||February 15, 2003||2–1 || align="left"|  Ottawa Senators (2002–03) ||32–21–4–1 || 
|- align="center" bgcolor="#CCFFCC"
|59||W||February 18, 2003||4–3 || align="left"|  Carolina Hurricanes (2002–03) ||33–21–4–1 || 
|- align="center" bgcolor="#CCFFCC"
|60||W||February 20, 2003||6–2 || align="left"| @ Washington Capitals (2002–03) ||34–21–4–1 || 
|- align="center" bgcolor="#CCFFCC"
|61||W||February 22, 2003||5–3 || align="left"| @ Montreal Canadiens (2002–03) ||35–21–4–1 || 
|- align="center" bgcolor="#FFBBBB"
|62||L||February 23, 2003||2–5 || align="left"|  Nashville Predators (2002–03) ||35–22–4–1 || 
|- align="center" bgcolor="#CCFFCC"
|63||W||February 25, 2003||5–2 || align="left"|  New York Islanders (2002–03) ||36–22–4–1 || 
|- align="center" bgcolor="#FFBBBB"
|64||L||February 27, 2003||2–7 || align="left"| @ Detroit Red Wings (2002–03) ||36–23–4–1 || 
|-

|- align="center" bgcolor="#CCFFCC"
|65||W||March 1, 2003||4–1 || align="left"|  Carolina Hurricanes (2002–03) ||37–23–4–1 || 
|- align="center" bgcolor="#FFBBBB"
|66||L||March 3, 2003||1–2 || align="left"|  Florida Panthers (2002–03) ||37–24–4–1 || 
|- align="center" bgcolor="#FFBBBB"
|67||L||March 4, 2003||1–4 || align="left"| @ Ottawa Senators (2002–03) ||37–25–4–1 || 
|- align="center" bgcolor="#FFBBBB"
|68||L||March 6, 2003||2–4 || align="left"| @ Buffalo Sabres (2002–03) ||37–26–4–1 || 
|- align="center"
|69||T||March 8, 2003||3–3 OT|| align="left"|  Vancouver Canucks (2002–03) ||37–26–5–1 || 
|- align="center" bgcolor="#CCFFCC"
|70||W||March 10, 2003||3–2 || align="left"| @ Edmonton Oilers (2002–03) ||38–26–5–1 || 
|- align="center" bgcolor="#ffc"
|71||OTL||March 13, 2003||3–4 OT|| align="left"| @ Calgary Flames (2002–03) ||38–26–5–2 || 
|- align="center" bgcolor="#CCFFCC"
|72||W||March 15, 2003||1–0 || align="left"| @ Vancouver Canucks (2002–03) ||39–26–5–2 || 
|- align="center"
|73||T||March 18, 2003||3–3 OT|| align="left"|  New York Islanders (2002–03) ||39–26–6–2 || 
|- align="center" bgcolor="#ffc"
|74||OTL||March 20, 2003||3–4 OT|| align="left"| @ Columbus Blue Jackets (2002–03) ||39–26–6–3 || 
|- align="center" bgcolor="#CCFFCC"
|75||W||March 22, 2003||3–2 OT|| align="left"|  Buffalo Sabres (2002–03) ||40–26–6–3 || 
|- align="center" bgcolor="#FFBBBB"
|76||L||March 24, 2003||2–3 || align="left"| @ Boston Bruins (2002–03) ||40–27–6–3 || 
|- align="center"
|77||T||March 25, 2003||3–3 OT|| align="left"| @ Carolina Hurricanes (2002–03) ||40–27–7–3 || 
|- align="center" bgcolor="#CCFFCC"
|78||W||March 28, 2003||5–2 || align="left"| @ New York Islanders (2002–03) ||41–27–7–3 || 
|- align="center" bgcolor="#CCFFCC"
|79||W||March 29, 2003||4–3 OT|| align="left"|  Washington Capitals (2002–03) ||42–27–7–3 || 
|-

|- align="center" bgcolor="#CCFFCC"
|80||W||April 1, 2003||3–2 OT|| align="left"| @ New Jersey Devils (2002–03) ||43–27–7–3 || 
|- align="center" bgcolor="#CCFFCC"
|81||W||April 3, 2003||2–1 || align="left"|  Minnesota Wild (2002–03) ||44–27–7–3 || 
|- align="center" bgcolor="#FFBBBB"
|82||L||April 5, 2003||1–3 || align="left"|  Ottawa Senators (2002–03) ||44–28–7–3 || 
|-

|-
| Legend:

 † Hockey Hall of Fame Game

Playoffs

|- align="center" bgcolor="#CCFFCC"
| 1 ||W|| April 9, 2003 || 5–3 || @ Philadelphia Flyers || 18,937 || Maple Leafs lead 1–0 || 
|- align="center" bgcolor="#FFBBBB"
| 2 ||L|| April 11, 2003 || 1–4 || @ Philadelphia Flyers || 19,597 || Series tied 1–1 || 
|- align="center" bgcolor="#CCFFCC"
| 3 ||W|| April 14, 2003 || 4–3 2OT || Philadelphia Flyers || 19,533 || Maple Leafs lead 2–1 || 
|- align="center" bgcolor="#FFBBBB"
| 4 ||L|| April 16, 2003 || 2–3 3OT || Philadelphia Flyers || 19,574 || Series tied 2–2 || 
|- align="center" bgcolor="#FFBBBB"
| 5 ||L|| April 19, 2003 || 1–4 || @ Philadelphia Flyers || 19,828 || Flyers lead 3–2 || 
|- align="center" bgcolor="#CCFFCC"
| 6 ||W|| April 21, 2003 || 2–1 2OT || Philadelphia Flyers || 19,573 || Series tied 3–3 || 
|- align="center" bgcolor="#FFBBBB"
| 7 ||L|| April 22, 2003 || 1–6 || @ Philadelphia Flyers || 19,870 || Flyers win 4–3 || 
|-

|-
| Legend:

Player statistics

Scoring
 Position abbreviations: C = Centre; D = Defence; G = Goaltender; LW = Left Wing; RW = Right Wing
  = Joined team via a transaction (e.g., trade, waivers, signing) during the season. Stats reflect time with the Maple Leafs only.
  = Left team via a transaction (e.g., trade, waivers, release) during the season. Stats reflect time with the Maple Leafs only.

Goaltending

Awards and records

Awards

Milestones

Transactions
The Maple Leafs were involved in the following transactions from June 14, 2002, the day after the deciding game of the 2002 Stanley Cup Finals, through June 9, 2003, the day of the deciding game of the 2003 Stanley Cup Finals.

Trades

Players acquired

Players lost

Signings

Draft picks
Toronto's draft picks at the 2002 NHL Entry Draft held at the Air Canada Centre in Toronto, Ontario.

See also
 2002–03 NHL season

Notes

References

Toronto Maple Leafs season, 2002-03
Toronto Maple Leafs seasons
Toronto